Close Enough is an American animated sitcom created by J. G. Quintel. Originally intended to air on TBS in 2017, the project faced various delays and setbacks before eventually premiering on HBO Max on July 9, 2020. The series has received positive reviews, with critics comparing it favorably to Quintel's previous series, Regular Show. 

In July 2022, HBO Max cancelled the series after three seasons. A month later, the show, alongside several other original and non-original content, was removed from the service.

Premise 
A couple in their early thirties, Josh and Emily, and their young daughter, Candice, live in a Los Angeles duplex with their divorced friends, Alex and Bridgette. They get into what seem like normal domestic crises, which tend to escalate in surreal (often even science fiction-esque) ways.

Cast and characters

Main 
 Joshua "Josh" Singleton (voiced by J.G. Quintel) – an aspiring video game developer who works for Plugger-Inners; a television installation company based on Geek Squad. His appearance and mannerisms are based on those of Quintel.
 Emily Ramirez (voiced by Gabrielle Walsh) – Josh's wife, who works as an assistant for a food corporation called FoodCorp. Emily and Bridgette play guitar and sing at local cafes hoping to become famous. She is based on Quintel's own wife, Cassia.
 Candice Singleton-Ramirez (voiced by Jessica DiCicco) – Josh and Emily's six-year-old (as of "Birthdaze") daughter, who can be very hyperactive and struggles with school work. She attends Chamomile Elementary School.
 Alex Dorpenberger (voiced by Jason Mantzoukas) – Josh's best friend and Bridgette's ex-husband, who works as a community college professor and a struggling Viking-themed fantasy author. He is a conspiracy theorist. Following the series finale "Match Made in Valhalla", Alex and Bridgette got back together.
 Bridgette Hashima (voiced by Kimiko Glenn) – Emily's best friend and Alex's ex-wife. She is a Japanese-American social media influencer, and a part-time comedy singer-songwriter in a band with Emily. Her middle name was revealed as "No Stress" in an episode from the first season, which also revealed that it was the result of a legal name change that she authorized while she was under the influence of drugs.
 Pearle Watson (voiced by Danielle Brooks) – A retired African-American LAPD police officer, and the landlady of the duplex.
 Randall "Randy" Watson (voiced by James Adomian) – Pearle's adopted white son, and the duplex's property manager. He was adopted by Pearle after his biological parents, Wyatt and Deborah Trickle, were arrested for siphoning gas from multiple cars. Randy is revealed to be gay in season 3.

Supporting 
 Mr. Timothy Campbell (voiced by John Early) – Candice's hippie teacher at Chamomile Elementary.
 Mr. Salt (voiced by Fred Stoller) – Emily's boss at FoodCorp.
 Dr. Glandz (voiced by Cheri Oteri) – A physician who works at a hospital called Pretty Good Samaritan.
 Dante (voiced by Eugene Cordero) – One of Josh's coworkers at Plugger-Inners who has a prosthetic lower arm.
 Jojo (voiced by Mo Collins) – A biker woman who is the leader of the Cool Moms, and the mother of Candice's classmate, Mia.
 Trish (voiced by Kate Higgins) – A former member of the Cool Moms and the mother of Candice's best friend and classmate, Maddie.
 Ms. Hashima (voiced by Suzy Nakamura) - Bridgette's mother.

Additional voices

Guest stars

Episodes

Season 1 (2020) 

The first season was originally set to run for 10 episodes, but only 8 episodes were released when the series launched.

Season 2 (2021) 

Every episode in this season was directed by J. G. Quintel and Calvin Wong.

Season 3 (2022)

Release 
The series was announced in May 2017, four months after Quintel's previous series, Regular Show, concluded its run on the sibling Cartoon Network. The series was originally announced to air on TBS, but was delayed several times. It would later be revealed that TBS had planned to premiere the show as part of its own animation block, but those plans fell through when production on The Cops was shut down due to Louis C.K.’s admitted sexual misconduct. On October 29, 2019, it was announced that the series would instead move to HBO Max. The second half of the third episode was premiered at the Annecy International Animated Film Festival on June 15, 2020.

On August 6, 2020, the series was renewed for a second season. The following month, the series was distributed internationally through Netflix as a Netflix Original, beginning September 14, 2020 in Latin America.

The second season premiered on February 25, 2021 on HBO Max. Prior to the season premiere, a third season was announced on February 10, 2021. The second season was released internationally on Netflix on May 26, 2021.

On October 24, 2021, the first two seasons became available to buy digitally on iTunes. The third season was released digitally on May 8, 2022.

With the announcement of TBS and TNT's Front Row blocks, the series debuted on the former network on October 25, 2021.

The third season premiered on April 7, 2022 on HBO Max. On July 15, 2022, HBO Max cancelled the series after three seasons. On August 17, 2022, the service announced the removal of several shows, including Close Enough.

Reception 
Review aggregator Rotten Tomatoes reported an approval rating of 100% based on 19 reviews, with an average rating of 8/10, for the first season. The website's critical consensus reads, "Completely absurd and yet, utterly relatable, Close Enough captures the strange experience that is being an adult." On Metacritic, it has a weighted average score of 74 out of 100 based on 6 reviews, indicating "generally favorable reviews".

References

External links 
 

HBO Max original programming
American animated sitcoms
2020s American adult animated television series
2020s American animated comedy television series
2020s American sitcoms
2020 American television series debuts
2022 American television series endings
American adult animated comedy television series
English-language television shows
Television series created by J. G. Quintel
Television series by Cartoon Network Studios
Animated television series about children
Television series about couples
Television shows set in Los Angeles
Television shows set in California